Marc's Grab Bag was a Canadian arts talk show television series which aired on CBC Television from 1973 to 1974.

Premise
Marc Stone hosted this youth-oriented talk show which was set in a coffee house. Topics were within the realm of arts with guests such as Karen Booth (animator), Monica Gaylord (pianist), Doug Hemmy (animator), Harris Kirschenbaum (film producer), Jack Schectman (singer-songwriter) and Naomi Tyrell (mime).

Scheduling
This half-hour series aired Tuesdays at 5:00 p.m. (Eastern) from 11 September to 16 October 1973. Broadcasts resumed in the same time slot on 8 January until the final original episode on 26 March 1974. Episodes were repeated from June to September 1974.

References

External links
 

CBC Television original programming
1970s Canadian television talk shows
1973 Canadian television series debuts
1974 Canadian television series endings
Television shows filmed in Toronto